David Harte (born 23 December 1981) is a Gaelic footballer who plays for the Errigal Ciarán club and for the Tyrone county team.

He was a member of the All-Ireland winning side of 2005 and also of the All-Ireland winning team of 2008. Harte plays his club football with Errigal Ciarán and has won two Tyrone Senior Football Championships and the Ulster Senior Football Championship with them.

He is one of the attack-minded defenders on the Tyrone panel, such as Ryan McMenamin. He is the nephew of Mickey Harte, who was Tyrone manager during his playing days.

References

1981 births
Living people
Errigal Ciarán Gaelic footballers
David
Schoolteachers from Northern Ireland
Tyrone inter-county Gaelic footballers
Winners of two All-Ireland medals (Gaelic football)